Raindance may refer to:

Rain dance, a Native American ritual dance to invoke rain
Raindance Communications, a US company that provides online meeting, web conferencing and teleconferencing services
Raindance Film Festival and Film School
Raindance (Transformers), a fictional character
Raindance (Clark Datchler album), 1990
Raindance (Gryphon album), 1975
Raindance (David Lasley album), 1984
Raindance (Sara Storer album), 2019
Raindance (rave), British Rave event organisers
Raindance Foundation, an early video art group and public access cable pioneer
RainDance Technologies, an American company founded by Jonathan Rothberg
Operation Raindance, a military offensive during the Laotian Civil War

See also
Raindancing, a 1987 album by Alison Moyet